Nicky 2, or Nicky II, is a platform game developed and originally released for the Amiga, Atari ST, and MS-DOS by Microïds in 1992. It is a sequel to 1992's Nicky Boom in which the boy Nicky returns to fight evil forces. Its iPhone version was released as Nicky Boom 2 in 2009.

Gameplay
The player controls the protagonist Nicky who moves on his feet and on a flying goose. Nicky's main weapons against monsters are firecracker bombs, stones, and ultrasound whistles.

Plot 
At the end of the first game, the little hero boy Nicky has managed to defeat the evil witch Zoldrane the Sorceress and rescue his grandfather, and it seemed peace was restored to their forest. But after his toys get mysteriously scattered, rumors arrive that the witch had an equally wicked but even more powerful sister who is now causing chaos and preparing terrible revenge. And so his grandfather sends Nicky with a magic goose to seek out her lair. If Nicky manages to reach and defeat the end boss (a dragon), a volcano erupts and destroys the entire dark realm as he flies away on his goose.

Reception
Nicky 2 received mixed ratings, including 67% from Amiga Computing, 72% from Amiga Format, 76% from Amiga Games, 68% from Amiga Joker, 58% from CU Amiga, D- from Amiga Game Zone, 77% from Génération 4, and 78% (Amiga) and 72% (Atari ST) from Joystick.

References

External links
Play Nicky Boum and Nicky 2 at Microids website 

Nicky 2 at Lemon Amiga
Nicky Boom & Nicky 2 at DotEmu

1992 video games
Amiga games
Atari ST games
DOS games
Fantasy video games
IOS games
MacOS games
Microïds games
Mobile games
Side-scrolling platform games
Single-player video games
Video games about witchcraft
Video games developed in France
Video game sequels
Windows games